The Pueblo of Santo Domingo (Kiua), in Sandoval County, New Mexico, in the general area of Albuquerque, New Mexico dates from 1700. A  area of the pueblo was listed on the National Register of Historic Places in 1973.  The listing included 80 contributing buildings.

It is located 35 miles (56 km) northeast of Albuquerque, off Interstate 25.

References

Pueblos
National Register of Historic Places in Sandoval County, New Mexico
Buildings and structures completed in 1700